The Serbian language is one of the officially recognized minority languages in Croatia. It is primarily used by the Serbs of Croatia. The Croatian Constitution, Croatian Constitutional law on national minorities rights, Law on Education in Language and Script of National Minorities and Law on Use of Languages and Scripts of National Minorities define the public co-official usage of Serbian in Croatia. Serbian and Croatian are two standardized varieties of the pluricentric Serbo-Croatian language. The majority of Serbs of Croatia use Ijekavian pronunciation of Proto-Slavic vowel jat except in the Podunavlje region in Vukovar-Syrmia and Osijek-Baranja Counties where local Serb population use Ekavian pronunciation. Post-World War II and Croatian War of Independence settlers in Podunavlje which have come from Bosnia, Dalmatia or Western Slavonia either use their original Ijekavian pronunciation, adopted Ekavian pronunciation or both of them depending on context. In 2011 Census majority of Serbs of Croatia declared Croatian standardized variety as their first language with Ijekavian pronunciation always being required standard form in Croatian. While Serbian variety recognizes both pronunciations as standard, Ekavian is the more common one as it is the dominant one in Serbia, with Ijekavian being dominant in Bosnia-Herzegovina, Montenegro and Croatia.

History
The Orthodox liturgical book Varaždin Apostol from 1454 represents the oldest preserved text in Cyrillic from the territory of today's Croatia. Croatian Constitutional law on national minorities rights, one of only two constitutional laws in country, entered into force on 23 December 2002.

In April 2015 the United Nations Human Rights Committee urged the Croatian government to ensure the right of minorities to use their language and alphabet. The report noted the use of Serbian Cyrillic in Vukovar and municipalities concerned. Serbian Foreign Minister Ivica Dačić said that his country welcomes the UN Human Rights Committee's report.

Serbian language education

Most schools with instruction in Serbian are located in Vukovar-Srijem and Osijek-Baranja County in the area of former Eastern Slavonia, Baranja and Western Syrmia where rights on education in minority languages were provided during the United Nations Transitional Administration for Eastern Slavonia, Baranja and Western Sirmium based on the  Erdut Agreement. Today with those schools there is also Kantakuzina Katarina Branković Serbian Orthodox Secondary School in Zagreb.

In the school year 2010–2011, 3.742 students attended kindergartens, primary and secondary schools in Serbian. 59 educational institutions offered Serbian language education that year and 561 educators and teachers worked in them. In school year 2011–2012 the total number of students was 4.059 in 63 educational institutions and 563 educators and teachers worked in them. Number of classes or groups in this period increased from 322 to 353.

As a chair at the Department of South Slavic languages, Faculty of Humanities and Social Sciences at the University of Zagreb has a The Chair of Serbian and Montenegrin literature. Among the others, lecturers of Serbian literature at the university over the time included Antun Barac, Đuro Šurmin and Armin Pavić.

Other forms of cultural autonomy
Various minority organizations use Serbian in their work. One of them, Association for Serbian language and literature in Croatia from Vukovar is a nonprofit professional organization that brings together scientists and technical workers in the Republic of Croatia engaged in studying and teaching of Serbian language and literature.

The co-official use at local government level
The Law on Use of Languages and Scripts of National Minorities provides for a mandatory co-official use of minority languages in municipalities of Croatia with at least one third of members of ethnic minority. Municipalities Dvor, Gvozd, Jagodnjak, Šodolovci, Borovo, Trpinja, Markušica, Negoslavci, Biskupija, Ervenik, Kistanje, Gračac, Udbina and Erdut, according to the provisions of law, are obliged to grant equal co-official use of Serbian language and Serbian Cyrillic alphabet. Donji Kukuruzari, Vrbovsko and most notably Vukovar were obliged to do so up until the 2021 census had shown that Serbs no longer made up at least one third of the population in these municipalities or towns. Law enforcement is facing great resistance in the part of the majority population, most notably in the case of Vukovar where it led to 2013 Anti-Cyrillic protests in Croatia.

See also
Minority languages of Croatia
Law on Use of Languages and Scripts of National Minorities
European Charter for Regional or Minority Languages
Italian language in Croatia
Serbo-Croatian language
Anti-Cyrillic protests in Croatia

References

Minority rights
Linguistic rights
Language policy in Bosnia and Herzegovina, Croatia, Montenegro and Serbia
Languages of Croatia
Language
Serbian language